Suvi Do (Serbian Cyrillic: Cуви Дo) is a neighborhood of the city of Niš, Serbia. It is located in Niš municipality of Palilula.

Location
Suvi Do is located in the south-east part of Niš. It is bordered on the north by the Car Konstadin Boulevard, and on the west by neighborhood of Trosarina.

History
Suvi Do used to be a village but now it grow to a suburb. It was founded by a settler named Koca, in the 17th century.

Characteristics
The neighborhood is residential.

Neighborhoods of Niš